Nazarabad (also Romanized as Naz̧arābād) is a village in Sarjam Rural District, Ahmadabad District, Mashhad County, Razavi Khorasan Province, Iran. At the 2006 census, its population was 146, in 39 families.

References 

Populated places in Mashhad County